This is a list of NUTS2 statistical regions of Switzerland by Human Development Index as of 2023 with data for the year 2021. In the same year the Zurich Region had the highest HDI score out of 1790 sub-national regions of the world.

References 

Human Development Index
Switzerland

Switzerland